Stobbs is a surname of Northern English origin. Famous people with the surname Stobbs include:

Alex Stobbs, musician with cystic fibrosis
Chuck Stobbs (1929–2008), Major League Baseball pitcher
George R. Stobbs (1877–1966), Representative from Massachusetts
Harry Stobbs (1932–1978), Agricultural Scientist in Australia, a Memorial Lecture is dedicated to him 
Richard Stobbs, the former Republican Sheriff of Belmont County, Ohio
T. W. Stobbs, American football coach, head coach at Wittenberg University, 1929–1941
William Stobbs (1914–2000), author and illustrator